Exile (stylized as EXILE) is a 19-member Japanese boy band. Hiro is the group's leader, who debuted as a member of Zoo under For Life Music, but Exile have released their singles and albums under Avex Group's label Rhythm Zone. Hiro and Avex's president Max Matsuura came from the same high school. In 2003, the six original members of Exile founded the management and entertainment company LDH which has debuted many successful groups and soloists ever since. Exile is the representative group of the company.

In total, they have sold over 24 million records in Japan alone.

History

Pre-debut 
The current leader, Hiro, was originally in the pop group Zoo before they split up in 1995. In 1999, he started a new group called J Soul Brothers, which later changed its name to Exile in 2001. (But the name of J Soul Brothers was later revived by Hiro again in 2007 when he helped to form another 7-member group under the new J Soul Brothers moniker.)

Debut and second generation 
Atsushi and Shun became the lead vocalists of the group. Atsushi is a fan of American R&B group Boyz II Men. In November 2003, Exile remade Zoo's hit single "Choo Choo Train", which became a strong promotional single for their third studio album Exile Entertainment. The album sold over a million copies. They took part in the NHK Kōhaku Uta Gassen of the year, singing "Choo Choo Train". At first, their music style was influenced by R&B, but their style later became more pop-oriented form. Their 2004 single "Real World" became their first number-one single on Oricon weekly charts. They released the collaboration "Scream" with Japanese rock band Glay in July 2005, peaking at No. 1 and selling over 500,000 copies on Oricon charts.

The group released "Tada...Aitakute" in December 2005 and "Yes!" in March 2006. Both singles topped the Oricon weekly charts. However, Shun left the group in March 2006 and became a solo singer. After the group sought a new vocalist from the public, Takahiro joined the group in September 2006. Takahiro originally tried to become a hairdresser in his school days, but eventually joined the group as a vocalist.

On February 14, 2007, the group released the single "Michi", which became their first number-one single on the Oricon charts since Takahiro joined the group. Their 2007 studio album, Exile Love, became the highest selling album of Japan in 2008, selling nearly 1.5 million copies on Oricon charts. Their compilation album Exile Ballad Best sold nearly 1 million copies in its first week on Oricon charts, making it the highest first week sales for an album of Japan in 2008. The song, "Ti Amo", was certified Million by the Recording Industry Association of Japan (RIAJ) for 1,000,000 full-track ringtone digital music downloads (Chaku Uta Full). They also won the Grand Prix Award at the 50th edition of Japan Record Awards for "Ti Amo".

Wider success: Third generation and Hiro's departure 
In 2009, Exile's song "The Next Door" was featured as the theme of the Japanese edition of Street Fighter IV. The song was released at the iTunes Store on February 22, 2009. The English version "The Next Door -Indestructible-" was used for the international edition of the game. The English version was released as the third track of their single "The Hurricane (Fireworks)" on July 22, 2009, featuring American rapper Flo Rida.

On March 1, 2009, Exile and Nidaime J Soul Brothers announced that they would merge to become a 14-member group. They released their first studio album with 14 members, Aisubeki Mirai e, on December 2, 2009. They won the Grand Prix Award for the second year in a row with the song, "Someday", at the 51st Japan Record Awards.From May 9, Exile Live Tour 2009  'The Monster started. At the end of the year, They won the Grand Prix Award for the second year in a row with the song, "Someday", at the 51st Japan Record Awards.

On April 17, 2010, Exile's TV talk show EXE started to be broadcast on TBS, while the show was also broadcast simultaneously on Taiwan's CTV channel. On May 19, 2010, Avex released the CD maxi of the suite , or "The Country of the Sun," written by Yasushi Akimoto and sung by Exile, for the 20th anniversary of the accedence of the Emperor of Japan Akihito. However, the CD was not reflected on the Oricon charts. From July 2010, Exile held their first stadium tour, Exile Live Tour 2010 Fantasy. For the 52nd Japan Record Awards, the group earned their third consecutive win with the song "I Wish For You".  "I Wish For You" was also the theme song for Tokyo Broadcasting System's (TBS) domestic broadcasts of the 2010 FIVB Volleyball Women's World Championship and members of the band were in the crowd for Japan's bronze medal win, which was their first medal in 32 years.

From 2011, Exile started to perform in other Asian countries apart from its homeland Japan. They performed in The 2011 Jade Solid Gold Best Ten Music Awards Presentation in Hong Kong on January 15 as special guests. On September 25, Exile performed in Three Kingdoms Performing Arts – China, Japan, and Korea Music Festival  in Beijing, which was Exile's first participation in a live performance events outside Japan. On September 14, 2011, Exile released "Rising Sun", a single contain Rising Sun, the famous and popular song in support of the recovery after the 2011 Tōhoku earthquake and tsunami. From November 2011, Exile started their second dome tour, Exile Live Tour 2011 Tower of Wish ～Tower of Wish～. The group was the 3rd artist by total sales revenue in Japan in 2011, with ¥5.603 billion, and the 2nd in 2012, with ¥12.177 billion.

On January 1, 2012, Exile released their ninth album EXILE JAPAN/Solo . The album landed 1st on Oricon Albums Chart for three continual weeks, which set a new record for the group. In June,  Exile won Best Video of the Year at MTV Video Music Awards Japan, which marked Exile 4th wins in the award's 11 years history.

On April 3, 2013, EXILE's leader HIRO, who had been a performer for 24 years prior, announced that he would be retiring from the group as a performer at the end of 2013. He stated that he would still continue to be the leader and producer of the group. On the same day, EXILE released their 41st single "EXILE PRIDE ~Konna Sekai wo Aisuru Tame~". The single became Exile's first single to be sold more than 1 million copies in October of the same year, and it won the group a fourth Japan Record Award. This was the group's first win since their consecutive winning streak was broken by the Idol group AKB48, and Exile became the first artist to win the award four times. In April, Exile held their third dome tour called Exile Live Tour 2013 'Exile Pride''' .

 New era: Fourth generation members 

In April 2014, EXILE's Chapter 4 kicked off. On the final stage of EXILE's 3rd audition "EXILE PERFORMER BATTLE AUDITION", the winners, aka new members of Exile, were announced. Out of 2000 applicants, only 5 members were chosen. Those members were Takanori Iwata from Sandaime J Soul Brothers, Alan Shirahama and Mandy Sekiguchi from Generations, Sekai Yamamoto and Taiki Sato. Their first single in EXILE, "NEW HORIZON", was released a few months later, on July 23, 2014. From September, The new Exile started their first tour, Exile Tribe Perfect Year Live Tour Tower of Wish 2014 〜The Revolution〜. On March 25, 2015, the group released their tenth studio album 19 -Road to AMAZING WORLD-. From September 2015, They started a new national tour,  Exile Live Tour 2015 'Amazing World.

On June 22, 2015, members Toshio Matsumoto, ÜSA and MAKIDAI announced to be retiring from their positions of performers on the group within the year. Their last single with the group would be "Ki・mi・ni・mu・chu", a song which was used for the CM advertising Suntory's "The Malts". On December 31, 2015, Matsumoto Toshio, ÜSA and MAKIDAI retired from their positions of performers on the group on the New Year's special show CDTV Special! New Year's Eve Premiere Live 2015 → 2016. Although retiring as EXILE performers, ÜSA was revealed to remain as performer on the unit DANCE EARTH PARTY, and MAKIDAI would continue his music career as DJ MAKIDAI.

On April 14, 2016, a Documentary of Matsumoto Toshio, ÜSA and MAKIDAI's final tour 'AMAZING WORLD' was released .On August 17, 2016, Exile released their 48th singles, "Joy-ride ~Kanki no Drive~", which was Fuji television's theme song for the Rio Olympics.

On 25 July 2018, Exile released a new original Album, Star of Wish . From September, they started their 5th dome tour Exile Live Tour 2018–2019 'Star of Wish'.''

Band members
Since the formation of EXILE there have been many new generations of members as well as departures. As of 2021, AKIRA (Performer) is the longest serving active member of EXILE. Although HIRO is no longer an active member, he still remains EXILE's leader and occasionally appears in EXILE's Music Video's and Events. There are currently 13 active members in the group.

Performers

Vocalists

Vocalists and performers

Former members

Timeline of active members

Discography

Albums

Studio albums

Best-of albums

Other albums

Singles

Collaborations

Others

Awards and nominations

See also 

Japan Record Award
MTV Video Music Awards Japan
List of best-selling music artists in Japan

References

External links
 Official Exile website 
 Scream – Official Glay x Exile "Scream" website 
 Exile mobile global
 EXILE mobile  
  
 
 EX FAMILY -EXILE TRIBE OFFICIAL FAN CLUB-
 
 

Avex Group artists
World Music Awards winners
Japanese pop music groups
Musical groups from Tokyo
Japanese boy bands